A list of American films released in 1984. 
Amadeus won the Academy Award for Best Picture. The highest-grossing film of 1984 was Beverly Hills Cop.



A-B

C-G

H-M

N-S

T-Z

See also
 1984 in American television
 1984 in the United States

External links

 
 List of 1984 box office number-one films in the United States

1984
Films
Lists of 1984 films by country or language